Echinocereus poselgeri, also known as the dahlia cactus, is a species of Echinocereus. It is native to Coahuila and southern Texas.

References

poselgeri
Cacti of Mexico
Cacti of the United States
Flora of Texas